Clitenella fulminans is a species of skeletonizing leaf beetle in the family Chrysomelidae. It is found in Taiwan and eastern Asia.

References

Galerucinae
Beetles of Asia
Beetles described in 1835
Taxa named by Franz Faldermann